The Emerald Mound and Village Site (Emerald Site) is a pre-Columbian archaeological site located northwest of the junction of Emerald Mound Grange and Midgley Neiss Roads in St. Clair County, Illinois. The site includes five mounds, two of which have been destroyed by modern activity, and the remains of a village. Middle Mississippian peoples inhabited the village, which was a satellite village of Cahokia. At the time of its discovery, the mound was the second-largest known in Illinois after Monks Mound at Cahokia.

The site was added to the National Register of Historic Places on October 26, 1971.

References

External links 
 
 
 

Archaeological sites on the National Register of Historic Places in Illinois
National Register of Historic Places in St. Clair County, Illinois
Middle Mississippian culture
Mounds in Illinois